Yeşilköy (Laz language: Pancholi; პანჭოლი) is a village in the Hopa District, Artvin Province, Turkey. Its population is 106 (2021).

References

Villages in Hopa District
Laz settlements in Turkey